The Australasian Emergency Nursing Journal is a quarterly peer-reviewed nursing journal covering issues in emergency nursing. It is the official journal of the College of Emergency Nursing Australasia and is published on their behalf by Elsevier.

External links 
 

Emergency nursing journals
Elsevier academic journals
Quarterly journals
English-language journals
Publications established in 1998
Academic journals associated with learned and professional societies